Following is a list of all Article III United States federal judges appointed by President James K. Polk during his presidency. In total Polk appointed 10 Article III federal judges, including 2 Justices to the Supreme Court of the United States, 1 judge to the United States Circuit Court of the District of Columbia, and 7 judges to the United States district courts.

Polk faced some obstacles in seating Justices on the Supreme Court. After Henry Baldwin's death in April 1844, Polk nominated James Buchanan for the seat, but Buchanan declined the nomination. Polk then nominated George Washington Woodward of Pennsylvania to Baldwin's seat, but the nomination was rejected by the United States Senate by a vote of 20-29. Polk finally succeeded with the nomination of Robert Cooper Grier, filling the vacancy after two years.

United States Supreme Court justices

Circuit courts

District courts

Notes

References
General

 

Specific

Sources
 Federal Judicial Center

Polk

Presidency of James K. Polk